Farewell Tour may refer to:

 Farewell tour, a concert tour intended to signal the retirement of a singer or disbanding of a band
 Farewell Tour (album), by the Doobie Brothers, 1983
 Slayer Farewell Tour, 2018–2019
 The Farewell Tour, or Greatest Hits Tour (Westlife), by Westlife, 2012
 Living Proof: The Farewell Tour, by Cher, 2002–2005
 The Farewell Tour (video), 2003 
 Live! The Farewell Tour, a 2003 live album 
 Foreign Affair: The Farewell Tour, by Tina Turner, 1990
 End of the Road World Tour, by Kiss, 2019–present
 2023 Tour, by Bruce Springsteen, 2023

See also